Urgeiriça is a village in northern Portugal near the town of Viseu. It is part of the civil parish of Canas de Senhorim, in the municipality of Nelas.

Small uranium mines and a processing plant are located at this village.  Radium mined during the early years of this site supplied Madame Curie.  During World War II, control of the uranium resources was a source of concern for the dueling countries.  Many countries have purchased uranium mined and then processed into yellowcake from this site including Iraq in 1980.

References
Jolliffe, Jill. (January 14, 1986). "The Portuguese ponder the nuclear option / British firms may build nuclear reactors for Portugal". The Guardian (London).

External links

Populated places in Viseu District
Mining communities in Portugal
Nelas
Villages in Portugal